Henry I was the Count of Louvain from 1015 until 1038. He was a member of the House of Reginar.

He was a child of Count Lambert I of Louvain and his wife, Gerberga, daughter of Duke Charles of Lower Lorraine. Henry succeeded his father on his father's death in 1015.

Henry married an unnamed woman and had three daughters but no sons. Without a male heir, he was succeeded by his brother, Lambert II.

House of Reginar
Counts of Louvain